Shahrbanoo Mansourian (born 28 January 1986, Semirom, Isfahan) is an Iranian wushu athlete who competes in the sanda division. She is a five-time world champion (2011, 2013, 2015, 2017 and 2019).

Her sisters Elaheh Mansourian and Soheila Mansourian are also athletes and world champions in wushu.

References

External links

1986 births
Living people
Iranian sanshou practitioners
Asian Games silver medalists for Iran
Asian Games medalists in wushu
Wushu practitioners at the 2014 Asian Games
Wushu practitioners at the 2018 Asian Games
Medalists at the 2018 Asian Games
People from Semirom